Holm oak may refer to:

 Quercus ilex, tree native to South and Southeast Europe and parts of France
 Quercus rotundifolia, tree native to the Iberian Peninsula and Northwest Africa
 Quercus agrifolia, tree native to the Southwestern United States and Northern Mexico

Quercus taxa by common names